33a is a Georgian folk-rock band founded in Tbilisi in 1994. The band combines Georgian and French folk influences with pop and reggae elements. They chiefly perform in Georgian and French. Currently, the band consists of four members: Niaz Diasamidze — lead vocal, guitar, keyboard, panduri; Spartak Kacharava — drums; Achiko Tsimakuridze — guitar; Ramaz Khatiashvili — bass guitar.

The name "33a" comes from the address — 33a, Paliashvili street, where the founder of the band Niaz Diasamidze lives.

Discography
 Tbilisi (1997)
 Hurry up slowly (1999)
 Way (2001)
 New album (2005)
 Saperavi (2011)
 Usakhelouri (2013)
 Georgian (2017)
 War and Freedom (2022)

External links 
33a  on Radio.ge 
33a at Last.FM

Rock music groups from Georgia (country)
Folk rock groups from Georgia (country)
Pop rock music groups from Georgia (country)
French-language singers
Musical groups established in 1994
1994 establishments in Georgia (country)